"6 Years – 6 Nights" is a song by Blue System. It is the first track on their 1994 ninth studio album, 21st Century, and was released as its lead single.

The single debuted at number 96 in Germany for the week of March 28, 1994, two weeks later re-entering at number 47, which would remain its highest position.

Composition 
The song is written and produced by Dieter Bohlen.

Charts

References 

1994 songs
1994 singles
Blue System songs
Hansa Records singles
Songs written by Dieter Bohlen
Song recordings produced by Dieter Bohlen